The Twin is the second studio album by Sound of Ceres, released on October 6, 2017.

Track listing

Personnel

Sound of Ceres 
Derrick Bozich - Guitar synthesizer
Jacob Graham - Synthesizer
Karen Hover - Vocals 
Ryan Hover - Composer, programming, vocals
Ben Phelan - Synthesizer

Production 
Alastair Reynolds - Story
Justin Shturtz - Mastering
Alex Somers - Instrumentation, mixing, producer

References 

2017 albums
Sound of Ceres albums
Joyful Noise Recordings albums